Horace Hodges (19 December 1863 – 6 July 1951) was a British stage and film actor and writer.

Hodges was the author (with Thomas Wigney Percyval) of the play Grumpy which saw a Broadway production in 1913, a silent film version in 1923, and a sound version in 1930, with a Spanish film version Cascarrabias in the same year.

Selected filmography
 Escape (1930) - Gentleman
 Other People's Sins (1931) - Carfax
 A Night in Montmartre (1931) - Lucien Borell
 After Dark (1933) - Thaddeus Cattermole Brompton
 Summer Lightning (1933) - Lord Emsworth
 Rolling in Money (1934) - Earl of Addleton
 Summer Lightning (1933) - Johnnie Lee
 Old Faithful (1935) - Bill Brunning
 Birds of a Feather (1936) - Lord Cheverton
 Three Maxims (1936) - Mike
 London Melody (1937) - Father Donnelly
 The Show Goes On (1937) - Sam Bishop
 Follow Your Star (1938) - Mr. Wilmot
 Jamaica Inn (1939) - Chadwick - Sir Humphrey's Butler (final film role)

References

External links

1865 births
1951 deaths
British male stage actors
British male film actors
20th-century British male actors
20th-century British dramatists and playwrights